2013 Emmy Awards may refer to:

 65th Primetime Emmy Awards, the 2013 Emmy Awards ceremony that honored primetime programming during June 2012 – May 2013
 40th Daytime Emmy Awards, the 2013 Emmy Awards ceremony that honored daytime programming during 2012
 34th Sports Emmy Awards, the 2013 Emmy Awards ceremony that honored sports programming during 2012
 41st International Emmy Awards, honoring international programming

Emmy Award ceremonies by year